Psidium acutangulum is a species of tree in the family Myrtaceae. It is native to South America.

References

acutangulum
Trees of Peru
Trees of Brazil
Trees of Bolivia
Trees of Colombia
Trees of Venezuela
Trees of Guyana
Trees of Ecuador
Trees of Suriname
Trees of French Guiana